is a Ferris wheel built at the Old Port of Montreal, Quebec, Canada for the festivities for the 375th anniversary of the city. Open to the public since 1 September 2017, it is the tallest Ferris wheel in Canada. It is owned by Sandibe Global BV.

Operation 
Located on Bonsecours Basin Island in the Old Port of Montreal, it is open to the public daily from 10:00 a.m. to 11:00 p.m. and admittance allows for 20 minutes of use.

Design and conception 
 is a Ferris wheel model WS60 (White Series 60 metres) from the Dutch Wheels company (Vekoma group). It is the fourth of the type installed worldwide following ones in Hong Kong (2014), Baku (2014), and Chicago (2016).

Each unit can fit 8 persons and are accessible for a total capacity of 336 passengers. Climate-controlled cabins and the use of steel graded for use at  allows for the wheel to operate year-round.

The wheel is driven by four pairs of electric motors controlled by a variable-frequency drive.

Panorama 
 provides a 360° view of the city, including Old Montreal, its historic buildings, Place Jacques-Cartier, and the architecture of Downtown Montreal with Mont Royal as the backdrop. To the south, the Saint Lawrence River and its seaway unfolds. In the middle of the river, Saint Helen's Island and Notre Dame Island are seen – which were the sites for Expo 67. In the evening Mont Royal can no longer be seen; however, the Mount Royal Cross is illuminated, and accompanies the changing lighting on Jacques-Cartier Bridge.

See also 
 List of Ferris wheels

References

External links 

Ferris wheels in Canada
Old Montreal
Tourist attractions in Montreal